Stroyevo is a rural locality (a village) in Vokhtozhskoye Rural Settlement, Gryazovetsky District, Vologda Oblast, Russia. The population was 27 as of 2002.

Geography 
Stroyevo is located 61 km southeast of Gryazovets (the district's administrative centre) by road. Chukharitsa is the nearest rural locality.

References 

Rural localities in Gryazovetsky District